Florence McLaughlin (1898 - 1972), sometimes credited as Florence McLoughlin, was an actress in the U.S. She appeared in numerous silent films including comedies with Oliver Hardy.

She was from Jacksonville, Florida.

She worked with the Vim Comedy Company. She was also part of the King-Bee Films Corporation. She appeared in two-reel comedies with Josh Binney.

Filmography
The Precious Parcel (1916) as Runt's Accomplice 
The Reformers (film) (1916) as Vampire
The Water Cure (1916)
A Maid to Order (1916) as The Lady of the House
The Serenade (film) (1916) as Florence
Mother's Child (1916) as Florence 
Twin Flats (1916)
Royal Blood (film) (1916)
Never Again (1916 film) as Their daughter 
A Warm Reception (1916) as Mrs. Price's daughter
Hired and Fired (1916)
Nerve and Gasoline (1916) as Florence 
Fat and Fickle (1916) as Florence 
Better Halves (film) (1916)
Their Vacation (1916)
The Schemers (film) (1916)
Love and Duty (1916 film) as His daughter
He Winked and Won (1916) as Florence
Aunt Bill (1916)
The Candy Trail (1916)
Thirty Days (1916 film)
Stranded (1916 comedy film)
Cupid's Rival (1917)
The Other Girl (1917 film) as Florence
The Goat (1917 film)
Back Stage (1917 film)
The Millionaire (1917 film)
The Hero (1917 film) as A Shy Maiden 
Dough Nuts (1917) as Waitress
The Villain (1917 film) as Florence
The Love Bugs (1917)

References

1898 births
1972 deaths
Actresses from Jacksonville, Florida
American film actresses
20th-century American actresses
American silent film actresses